Israel participated in the Eurovision Song Contest 2007 with the song "Push the Button" written by Kobi Oz. The song was performed by the band Teapacks, which was internally selected by the Israeli broadcaster Israel Broadcasting Authority (IBA) in January 2007 to compete at the 2007 contest in Helsinki, Finland. The song Teapacks would perform at Eurovision was selected through the national final Kdam Eurovision 2007 which took place on 27 February 2007 that featured four songs. "Push the Button" emerged as the winning song after achieving the highest score following the combination of votes from an eleven-member jury panel, an online vote and a public vote.

Israel competed in the semi-final of the Eurovision Song Contest which took place on 10 May 2007. Performing during the show in position 2, "Push the Button" was not announced among the top 10 entries of the semi-final and therefore did not qualify to compete in the final. It was later revealed that Israel placed twenty-fourth out of the 28 participating countries in the semi-final with 17 points.

Background 
Prior to the 2007 Contest, Israel had participated in the Eurovision Song Contest twenty-nine times since its first entry in 1973. Israel has won the contest on three occasions: in 1978 with the song "A-Ba-Ni-Bi" performed by Izhar Cohen and the Alphabeta, in 1979 with the song "Hallelujah" performed by Milk and Honey and in 1998 with the song "Diva" performed by Dana International. Since the introduction of semi-finals to the format of the Eurovision Song Contest in 2004, Israel has, to this point, managed to qualify to the final two times, including a top ten result in 2005 with Shiri Maimon and "HaSheket SheNish'ar" placing fourth. Israel had qualified to the final for two consecutive years in 2005 and 2006, which included their 2006 entry "Together We Are One" performed by Eddie Butler.

The Israeli national broadcaster, Israel Broadcasting Authority (IBA) had been in charge of the nation's participation in the contest since its debut in 1973. IBA confirmed Israel's participation in the contest on 10 October 2006. To select the Israeli entry for 2007, IBA conducted an internal selection to select the artist that would represent Israel and a national final to select the song for the artist.

Before Eurovision

Artist selection 
On 7 January 2007, IBA announced that the band Teapacks was selected as the Israeli representatives for the Eurovision Song Contest 2007. A special committee consisting of music industry professionals and members from IBA considered several artists, of which 2006 Swiss Eurovision entrant Liel and Michel Guriashvili were highly considered before Teapacks was ultimately selected. The members of the committee were Yoav Ginai (entertainment director of IBA), Yaakov Naveh (IBA artists representative), Dalia Cohen (musician and composer), Amnon Shiloni (director of Reshet Gimmel), Noam Gil-Or (editor and presenter at Reshet Gimmel), Bracha Rosenfeld (producer), Kobi Oshrat (composer), Yardena Arazi (1976 and 1988 Israeli Eurovision entrant), Haïm Ulliel (singer), Anastassia Michaeli (television presenter), Dafna Dekel (1992 Israeli Eurovision entrant) and Itzik Yehoshua (music editor at 88FM). It was also announced that a national final titled Kdam Eurovision 2007 featuring four songs would take place to select their song.

Kdam Eurovision 2007 
Four songs, all written by band member Kobi Oz, were provided by Teapacks for the competition. Prior to the final, the songs were presented on 22 February 2007 during a special presentation programme broadcast via radio on Reshet Gimmel, Reshet Bet and 88FM.

Final 
The final took place on 27 February 2007 at the Auditorium in Dorot, hosted by Natali Atiya and Noa Barak and broadcast on Channel 1 as well as online via IBA's official Eurovision Song Contest website Eurovil. All four competing songs were performed by Teapacks and the winning song, "Push the Button", was selected by a combination of the votes from four voting groups: an expert jury of IBA representatives (40%), online voting conducted through Eurovil (20%), public voting conducted through telephone (20%) and public voting conducted through SMS (20%). In addition to the performances of the competing songs, Haïm Ulliel, the band Knesiyat Hasekhel and The Aluminum Show performed as the interval acts.

At Eurovision
According to Eurovision rules, all nations with the exceptions of the host country, the "Big Four" (France, Germany, Spain and the United Kingdom) and the ten highest placed finishers in the 2006 contest are required to qualify from the semi-final in order to compete for the final; the top ten countries from each semi-final progress to the final. On 12 March 2007, a special allocation draw was held which determined the running order for the semi-final. During the allocation draw, it was determined that Israel would perform in position 2, following the entry from Bulgaria and before the entry from Cyprus. At the end of the semi-final, Israel was not announced among the top 10 entries in the semi-final and therefore failed to qualify to compete in the final. It was later revealed that Israel placed twenty-fourth in the semi-final, receiving a total of 17 points.

Voting 
Below is a breakdown of points awarded to Israel and awarded by Israel in the semi-final and grand final of the contest. The nation awarded its 12 points to Belarus in the semi-final and the final of the contest.

Points awarded to Israel

Points awarded by Israel

References

2007
Countries in the Eurovision Song Contest 2007
Eurovision